Stine Rossel (4 January 1975 – 20 October 2007)  was a Danish archaeologist. She was a postdoc and Instructor of Egyptology at the University of Copenhagen. Her interests included zooarchaeology, the effects of environmental change on animal use, and the rise of complex societies.

Stine was a zooarchaeologist who carried out analysis of faunal materials from several important archaeology sites in Egypt, Turkey, Pakistan, and Sudan. She received her PhD in Anthropology from Harvard University in 2007, and her PhD was titled "The development of productive subsistence economies in the Nile Valley: Zooarchaeological analysis at El-Mahasna and South Abydos, Upper Egypt".

For many years she was involved archaeological investigations at Abydos, where she analyzed recovered faunal materials. Her contribution to this project includes her dissertation and an article published in the Proceedings of the National Academy of Sciences on the domestication of the donkey.

On 20 October 2007, while hiking in the White Mountains in New Hampshire, Rossel died in an accident.

References

External links
Stine Rossel (1975-2007) blog entry at Københavns Universitet
Entry at Ministry of Science
Article from Boston.com

1975 births
2007 deaths
Danish archaeologists
Danish women archaeologists
Harvard University alumni
20th-century archaeologists